Cuore, the Italian-language word for "heart", may refer to:

 CUORE Experiment, a particle physics facility in the Laboratori Nazionali del Gran Sasso in Italy
 Cuore (magazine), a Spanish women's magazine established in 2006
 Cuore (zine), a satirical insert in the Italian communist newspaper l'Unità 1989–1997
 Daihatsu Cuore, a vehicle built by the Japanese car maker Daihatsu
 Heart (1948 film), an Italian drama film directed by Vittorio De Sica and Duilio Coletti
 Heart (novel), an 1886 children's novel by Edmondo De Amicis
3000 Leagues in Search of Mother, a Japanese animated television series and film based on the above novel
 Cuore (album), a 1998 album by Gianna Nannini

Italian words and phrases